First Baptist Simpsonville Chapel is a historic Southern Baptist chapel at 106 Church Street in Simpsonville, South Carolina, USA.

It was built in 1913 and added to the National Register in 1992.

References

Baptist churches in South Carolina
Churches on the National Register of Historic Places in South Carolina
Churches completed in 1913
20th-century Baptist churches in the United States
Churches in Greenville County, South Carolina
National Register of Historic Places in Greenville County, South Carolina
1913 establishments in South Carolina
Southern Baptist Convention churches
Simpsonville, South Carolina